Frederick William West (22 February 1905 – 13 June 1953) was an Australian rules footballer who played with Hawthorn in the Victorian Football League (VFL).

Notes

External links 

1905 births
1953 deaths
VFL/AFL players born in England
Australian rules footballers from Victoria (Australia)
Hawthorn Football Club players
Australian military personnel of World War II
English emigrants to Australia
Military personnel from Victoria (Australia)